Modern Science Fiction and the American Literary Community is a book by Frederick Andrew Lerner published in 1985.

Plot summary
Modern Science Fiction and the American Literary Community is an academic book containing notes, appendices and an index.

Reception
Dave Langford reviewed Modern Science Fiction and the American Literary Community for White Dwarf #74, and stated that "it assembles endless bitty quotes and paraphrases of what people have said about SF, and reads like [notes] for an evaluative study which, unlike this, might reach some actual conclusions."

Reviews
Review by Robert A. Collins (1985) in Fantasy Review, September 1985
Review by Tom Easton (1986) in Analog Science Fiction/Science Fact, March 1986
Review by K. V. Bailey (1986) in Vector 131
Review by Edward James (1986) in Foundation, #37 Autumn 1986

References

1985 novels